Jean-Paul Joseph Gonzalez (born August 28, 1947) is a French virologist. He graduated from the Medical School of Bordeaux University (M.D., Internal Medicine) France.

Research career 
Gonzalez is a virologist whose main fields of research encompass the fundamentals and domains of disease emergence, viral disease and eco-epidemiology (i.e. arbovirology, viral hemorrhagic fevers). He received his PhD in viral ecology in 1984 from the University of Clermont-Ferrand in France. He was recruited by the French Institute of Research for Development, IRD (alias ORSTOM), and he dedicated his career to research, training, and providing expertise for developing countries across the Americas, Africa and Asia. He has led field and laboratory teams of researchers in countries such as Brazil, Central African Republic, Gabon, Laos, Senegal, Sierra-Leone, Thailand, Ukraine and more. He worked as a fellow at the Center for Disease Control and Prevention in Atlanta and Fort Collins, and as a visiting professor at the Yale Arbovirus Research Unit (Yale University, School of Medicine). Gonzalez has been involved in high security laboratory practices and research and, early development of geographical information systems applied to infectious diseases. He and his teams have identified new pathogens for humans and animals, have developed tools and strategies for bio-surveillance, and control and prevention of highly infectious transmitted disease (i.e.: high consequence pathogens). He has developed several scientific concepts and research strategies for health (e.g.: long lasting co-evolution of germs and hosts). He was instrumental to introduce and applied the concept of One Health in low income countries.

Early life 
Gonzalez was born and raised near the town of Saint Georges de Didonne in South-West of France in 1947. His father, Jesus Gonzalez, was a Spanish immigrant, born in Madrid who fled from General Franco’s regime to France during the Spanish Civil War. Jean-Paul's mother, Jeanne Charlotte Rives, was third daughter of a barrel maker from the Blaye vineyard of Bordeaux. She raised their three children (Denis, Denise and Jean-Paul).

Medical learning and research 
Gonzalez graduated from the Medical School of Bordeaux University in 1974. By attending the same school, he also got a Master on Tropical Medicine and Hygiene as well as a Medical Diploma of the French Commercial Navy.

This was followed by a residence in French Guiana at the Hôpital André-Bouron, located on the left bank of the Maroni River on the amazonian forest. Gonzalez was in charge of the adult, pediatric, and geriatric wards, as well of the Acarouany leprosy hospital and, health control over the Maroni River border between French Guiana and Suriname. He returned to Bordeaux and took the position of associate professor of Parasitology and Fundamental Sciences at Bordeaux School of Medicine and as medical attendant at the Children Teaching Hopital (Hôpital des Enfants Malades). He also worked at the Saint-André Teaching Hospital as a biologist.

Gonzalez did its 18 months national duty as a Volunteer at the National Active Service (VSNA) at the Pasteur Institute of Tunis (Tunisia) where he traveled extensively for the Pasteur Institute as a WHO (World Health Organization) expert collecting mosquitoes’ larvae and identifying imago for the surveillance of malaria in Tunisia. There he published several fundamental articles on the Tunisian endemic fauna parasites (fresh water turtles, rodents and cockroaches). Gonzalez later spent more than ten years as laboratory chief, and then department head within the Institut Pasteur International Network (RIIP) in Bangui, Central African Republic, and in Dakar.In 1990 he was one of the first foreign doctors to work at the high containment laboratory (BSL4) in Atlanta. There he analyzed all the samples previously collected in Central Africa in search of Viral Hemorrhagic Fever traces including Ebola and Marburg, Arenavirus, Hantavirus, Crimean Congo Hemorrhagic virus and others. In the late 90s he began working as a professor of Epidemiology and Public Health at the Yale School of Medicine; focusing on arboviruses and hemorrhagic viral fevers including Argentinian, Bolivian, Brazilian, Venezuelan, and Dengue fevers among others.

Since the early 1980s to date he continues to study, train and give expertise on Viral Hemorrhagic fevers including, among others, a follow up on Ebola fever (alias Ebolavirus Disease) and other high consequence pathogens.

From 2008 to 2012 he was appointed as General Director of the International Center of Medical Research of Franceville, Republic of Gabon (CIRMF). Appointed there by the French Ministry of Europe and Foreign Affairs and, then nominated at the direction position by the Gabon President (H.E. Omar Bongo), he intensively participate to the development of innovative field of research of interest for Gabon’ public health, including preparedness and response of high consequent pathogens, One Health approach as a tool for public health improvement, co-founded the Central African Network for Sickle Cell Study (REDAC), among other advancements.

In 2012, he joined Metabiota, Inc. as Senior Staff Scientist, where he uses his expertise on emerging viral disease, biosafety, biosecurity and bio-surveillance, and trains scientists from low income countries of Africa and Eastern Europe. In 2017 he was appointed at Deputy Director of the Center of Excellence for Animal and Zoonotic Diseases (CEEZAD), Kansas State University (KSU). Where his work focuses extensively on zoonosis, perpetuating also his engagement on One Health approach (One Health News Letter) and Global Health.

He has published more than 250 peers reviewed (NCBI) scientific papers, books and book chapters.

References 

1947 births
Living people
French virologists
University of Bordeaux alumni